The 2012 Savannah State Tigers football team represented Savannah State University in the 2012 NCAA Division I FCS football season. The Tigers were members of the Mid-Eastern Athletic Conference (MEAC).  This was the second season under the guidance of head coach Steve Davenport. The Tigers played their home games at Ted Wright Stadium and they finished the 2012 season with a 1–10 record (0–8 in the MEAC) to finish last in the conference.

Coaches and support staff

Media
Radio flagship: WHCJ
Broadcasters: Toby Hyde (play-by-play), Curtis Foster (analyst)

Schedule

Game summaries

Oklahoma State

Florida State
For their second game of the season, the Tigers traveled to Tallahassee, Florida to face the #6 ranked Seminoles of Florida State. This was the first meeting between these teams. Prior to the game, the Seminoles were installed as 70 1/2 point favorites, reportedly making Savannah State the biggest underdogs in any college football game ever.

The Seminoles held the Tigers scoreless, winning 55–0. Florida State scored 35 points in the first quarter, with a 61-yd touchdown pass from EJ Manuel to Rodney Smith, a 6-yard touchdown run from Chris Thompson, an 8-yd touchdown pass from E.J. Manuel to Greg Dent, a 9-yd touchdown pass from E.J. Manuel to Kelvin Benjamin, and a 5-yd touchdown run from Devonta Freeman. Florida State added another thirteen points in the second quarter as the result of a 19-yard touchdown run from James Wilder, Jr. and another 1-yd touchdown run from James Wilder, Jr. with a subsequent failed point-after-attempt from kicker Dustin Hopkins, ending his streak of 145 consecutive extra point attempts. Florida State scored another seven points in the third quarter as the result of a 19-yd touchdown pass from Jacob Coker to Kelvin Benjamin.

The Seminoles totaled 413 yards of offense in the game, with 167 rushing yards and 246 passing yards while holding Savannah State to just 28 total yards of offense. The victory improved Florida State's all-time record against the Tigers to 1-0.

The game was delayed by lightning in the area in the second quarter and later called with 8:59 left in the third quarter, again due to weather.

North Carolina Central

Howard

Morgan State

Florida A&M

Edward Waters
Antonio Bostick threw for four touchdowns and ran for two as the Tigers defeated NAIA Edward Waters College for the first win of the season.  Bostick finished the game with 319 yards passing.

Hampton

Norfolk State

Bethune-Cookman

South Carolina State
South Carolina State defeated the Tigers 27-13 in the season finale for both teams. The Bulldogs led 13-7 at halftime and pushed the lead to 20-7 with 6:21 left in the third quarter.  The Tigers scored on a 10-yard pass from Victorian Hardison to Dylan Cook with 1:39 left in the third to pull the Tigers within a score, 20-13, but missed the extra point.  The Bulldogs blocked an SSU punt which put them in scoring position from the Tigers 20-yard line to seal the victory for the bulldogs.  The Tigers defense was led by Wayne Burden who had 11 tackles (10 solo) and 3 tackles for loss.

References

Savannah State
Savannah State Tigers football seasons
Savannah State Tigers football